The 1996 congressional elections in Maryland were held on November 5, 1996, to determine who will represent the state of Maryland in the United States House of Representatives. Maryland has eight seats in the House, apportioned according to the 1990 United States Census. Representatives are elected for two-year terms; those elected served in the 105th Congress from January 3, 1997 until January 3, 1999.

Overview

|- style="background-color: #e9e9e9; font-weight: bold;"
! scope="row" colspan="2" style="text-align: right;" | Totals
| style="text-align: right;" | 8
| style="text-align: right;" | 0
| style="text-align: right;" | 0
| style="text-align: right;" | —
| style="text-align: right;" | 100%
| style="text-align: right;" | 100%
| style="text-align: right;" | 1,639,245
| style="text-align: right;" |
|}

References

External links
 Maryland State Board of Elections

1996
Maryland
United States House of Representatives